There are at least 8 known synagogues in Kerala in recorded history, even though most of them are not operating anymore. Seven of the synagogues are used by the Cochin Jews, with one used by the Paradesi Jews. Each of these is quite unique in its construction and architecture; nevertheless, they retain very similar aesthetics, blending in both the Jewish and Keralite traditions rarified over centuries. A synagogue was called "Beit Knesset" (Malayalam: ബേത് ക്‌നേസേത് | Hebrew: בית כנסת) in Judeo-Malayalam or "Jootha Palli" (Malayalam: ജൂതപള്ളി) with joothan meaning Jew in Malayalam and -palli a suffix added to prayer houses of the Abrahamic faiths.

Only the Paradesi Synagogue in Mattancherry and the Kadavumbhagam Ernakulam Synagogue in Ernakulam downtown still functions as a synagogue and are popular tourist destinations. The Parur Synagogue, Chendamangalam Synagogue, Mala Synagogue are open to public visit, even if they do not serve their originally intended religious purposes anymore. They remain as souvenirs representative of Kerala's rich cosmopolitan heritage, religious tolerance, and cultural magnificence.

Many old synagogues are completely lost, a notable example being the Kochangadi Synagogue built in 1344 (the foundation stone of which is still retained in the Paradesi Synagogue), mostly likely after the Jews had to abandon Muziris due to the great flood of the Periyar river in 1341.

List of synagogues in Kerala

List of destroyed synagogues in Kerala 
Throughout their history numerous synagogues have been constructed and lost to time. in their first settlement at Shingly (Cranganore), there were 18 synagogues as per their oral traditions. Today no archaeological evidence has been yet uncovered to validate these traditions. However the custom of naming their synagogues as "Thekkumbhagam" (lit: south side) and "Kadavumbhagam" (lit: River side) is cited as a cultural memory of two such synagogues that once stood in Muziris. Several oral songs sung by Cochini women also contain references to these synagogues. Apart from these, numerous Syrian Christian churches of the St. Thomas Christian community in Kerala claim to have been built on old synagogues, though archaeological evidence is scarce.

Synagogues believed to have existed or speculated on basis of oral traditions include:

 Madayi Synagogue, Madayi
 Kodungaloor Synagogue/ Makotai Synagogue, Kodungallur
 Thekkumbhagam synagogue, Kodungallur
 Kadavumbhagam Synagogue, Kodungallur

Synagogues in recorded history whose location and/or remains have been lost in time:

 Palayoor Synagogue, Palur (known only from a rimon (ornament) bearing its name)
 Kokkamangalam Synagogue, Kokkamangalam
 Kochangadi Synagogue,(1344 A.D - 1789 A.D) Kochangadi (oldest synagogue in recorded history)
 Saudi Synagogue, (1514 A.D-1556 A.D), Saude, a locality south of Fort Kochi.
 Tir-Tur Synagogue, (1745 A.D-1768 A.D) Thiruthur, Kochi
 Muttam Synagogue (1800A.D), Muttam, Alappuzha
 Fort Kochi Synagogue, (1848 A.D), Fort Kochi (congregation of meschuhrarim)

Architectural similarities 

All the 8 synagogues in Kerala built during the recent centuries have similar traditional architectural features that include: 
 a central Bimah of brass or silver metal on a concrete or stone base
 an Ark or heckal on the western wall facing Jerusalem. 
 a balcony above the eastern entry to the sanctuary that is used by the hazzan (reader) on certain holidays. 
A second bimah on the upper gallery for women, unique to kerala synagogues. Often integrated into the wooden railing of the balcony.  
 a women's gallery behind the balcony, with a stairway leading up to it, usually from outside the building.

See also
 Synagogues in India
 Kerala Architecture
 Synagogue architecture
 International Jewish Architectural Heritage Foundation, New York, USA

References

 
Kerala
Lists of religious buildings and structures in India